"Wolves" is a song by American rapper Big Sean featuring fellow American rapper and singer Post Malone. It was sent to rhythmic contemporary radio on September 19, 2020, as the second single from Sean's fifth studio album Detroit 2 (2020). The song was produced by Take A Daytrip, with additional production from Teddy Walton and Samuel Bonhart. It also features additional vocals from American rapper ASAP Rocky.

Background and composition
The "motivational" song sees Big Sean rapping about being raised to overcome obstacles, while Post Malone adds melodic vocals to the track. Prior to its release, the song was previewed by Take a Daytrip on September 29, 2019 on Instagram Live. In an interview with Entertainment Weekly in October 2019, Sean stated that the song was about "my family growing up. Everybody's in there, my grandma, my mom, my brother — it's like they were a pack of wolves and they were the sweetest and strongest. It's one of my favorites on the album." When asked how he collaborated with Post Malone, he said:Post Malone heard it early. I ran into him at a restaurant, and we were kicking it. It was like a mutual-respect-type of exchange. We were both working, so I'm like, "I got this song. See what you think." When I sent it to him he was like, "Man, this is incredible. I have to, let's do it." A$AP Rocky is on there too, at the very beginning just doing some ad-libs.Big Sean also revealed in that interview that ASAP Rocky originally had a verse on the song, but it was moved to another song on Detroit 2.

Music video
The official music video was released on November 20, 2020. It features a cameo from Big Sean's mother, Myra Anderson. Sean and Post Malone "trade haunting verses in a sleek white warehouse", and also in front of a big red circle resembling a super blood wolf moon.

Charts

Certifications

References

2020 singles
2020 songs
Big Sean songs
Post Malone songs
Songs written by Big Sean
Songs written by Post Malone
Songs written by ASAP Rocky
Songs written by Louis Bell
Songs written by Teddy Walton
GOOD Music singles
Def Jam Recordings singles
Song recordings produced by Take a Daytrip